

Friedrich Franek (16 July 1891 – 8 April 1976) was an Austrian general in the armed forces of Nazi Germany during World War II. Along with Alois Windisch, he was one of only two recipients of both the Knight's Cross of the Iron Cross and the Knight's Cross of the Military Order of Maria Theresa, the highest military honour of Austria-Hungary.  

The son of a master baker, Franek joined the Austro-Hungarian Army in 1910 and served with distinction in World War I, winning the Gold Medal for Bravery. On 10 June 1921, the Chapter of the Military Order of Maria Theresa awarded Franek the Knight's Cross of the said Order in recognition of his conduct during the 11th Battle of the Isonzo. Had Franek received his appointment to the said Order before the abdication of the last Austro-Hungarian monarch, he would also have received a title of nobility as specified in the Statutes of the Military Order of Maria Theresa of 1895. Titles of nobility having been abolished in the Republic of Austria in 1919, Franek did not receive any such title in Austria.

After the end of the war, Franek remained in the army of the newly established Austrian republic. In 1925 he graduated with a PhD in political science.

After the Anschluss, Franek transferred to the German armed forces. In the summer of 1944, Franek was commanding the German 73rd Infantry Division as the Red Army was advancing through Poland. At the end of July, during the Lublin–Brest Offensive, he joined battle at Garwolin with the Soviet 2nd Guards Tank Army under the command of Alexei Radzievsky, when the German forces were routed and Franek was taken prisoner. He was released in 1948.

Awards 

 Knight's Cross of the Iron Cross on 4 November 1941 as Oberst and commander of Infanterie-Regiment 405

References

Citations

Bibliography

 

1891 births
1976 deaths
Military personnel from Vienna
Lieutenant generals of the German Army (Wehrmacht)
Austro-Hungarian military personnel of World War I
Recipients of the clasp to the Iron Cross, 2nd class
Knights Cross of the Military Order of Maria Theresa
Recipients of the Knight's Cross of the Iron Cross
Austrian prisoners of war
World War II prisoners of war held by the Soviet Union
Austro-Hungarian Army officers